The Swing of Delight is a 1980 double album by Carlos Santana.  It was released under his temporary Sanskrit name Devadip Carlos Santana, given to him by Sri Chinmoy.  It peaked at #65 on the charts.

On the album, Santana is joined by musicians from the Santana band as well as members of Miles Davis' 1960s quintet: saxophonist Wayne Shorter, pianist Herbie Hancock, bassist Ron Carter, and drummer Tony Williams, whom Santana described as "the best musicians on the planet." Santana later recalled that he was "scared to death" in the studio, but stated that playing with such top-notch musicians "will make a guitar player turn down—turn it down and go deep, deep inside himself for the inner stuff." 

The Swing of Delight was the last album on which Santana used the name Devadip, as he left Chinmoy's circle in 1982 due to his having become disillusioned with the guru.

Reception

In a review for AllMusic, William Ruhlmann called the album "a varied, jazz-oriented session that was one of [Carlos Santana's] more pleasant excursions from the standard Santana sound."

Rob Caldwell of All About Jazz stated that the album "hangs together remarkably well and still sounds fresh," and praised the "exemplary accompanying musicians."

Writing for Elsewhere, Graham Reid called the recording "One of those albums which was fascinating at the time, disappeared into history and which, when pulled off the shelf again offers some rewarding pieces as much as it frustrates at times."

Track listing

Side one
"Swapan Tari" (Sri Chinmoy) – 6:46
"Love Theme from "Spartacus"" (Alex North) – 6:50

Side two
"Phuler Matan" (Chinmoy) – 5:52
"Song for My Brother" (Carlos Santana) – 6:56

Side three
"Jharna Kala" (Chinmoy) – 7:11
"Gardenia" (Santana) – 7:08

Side four
"La Llave" (Santana) – 3:40
"Golden Hours" (Santana) – 6:36
"Sher Khan, the Tiger" (Wayne Shorter) – 5:45

Personnel

Musicians 
 Devadip Carlos Santana – electric guitar, acoustic guitar, 12-string guitar, percussion, vocals
 Wayne Shorter – soprano saxophone (tracks: 2, 6, 9), tenor saxophone (tracks: 3, 9)
 Premik Russell Tubbs – soprano saxophone (tracks: 1, 3), tenor saxophone (tracks: 4, 5), flute (tracks: 8)
 Herbie Hancock – acoustic piano, Fender Rhodes electric piano, Hohner Clavinet, synthesizers (Clavitar, Prophet 5, Yamaha CS-80, Oberheim 8 Voice, brass, strings)
 Ron Carter – acoustic bass (tracks: 2, 3, 6, 7, 9)
  David Margen – bass (tracks: 1, 4, 5, 8,)
 Harvey Mason – drums (tracks: 2, 4, 7, 9)
 Graham Lear – drums (tracks: 5, 8)
 Tony Williams – drums (tracks: 1, 3, 6)
 Armando Peraza – congas, bongos, percussion
 Raul Rekow – congas, percussion, vocals
 Orestes Vilató – timbales, percussion, vocals

Technical personnel 
 Engineer [assistant] – Bob Kovach
 Engineer [digital] – Jeff Mestler, Paul Stubblebine
 Engineer [guitar for Devadip Carlos Santana] – Steve Cain
 Engineer [keyboard for Herbie Hancock] – Bryan Bell
 Engineer [original mixing], producer – David Rubinson
 Engineer [recording] – Leslie Ann Jones
 Reissue producer – Moto Uehara
 Remastered by – Kouji Suzuki
 Design [concept] – Devadip Carlos Santana
 Artwork [front cover art] – Sri Chinmoy
 Artwork [inside art] – Tadanori Yokoo
 Photography by – Roger Ressmeyer

References

1980 albums
Columbia Records albums
Carlos Santana albums
Albums produced by Dave Rubinson